Follow Me! is a 1972 British comedy-drama film directed by Carol Reed and starring Mia Farrow, Topol and Michael Jayston. Adapted by Peter Shaffer from his own play (The Public Eye), the picture marks Carol Reed's last completed film.

The film was released in the United States under its original stage title The Public Eye.

The score was composed by John Barry and the film was edited by Anne V. Coates.

Plot
Set in London, it is the story of Charles, a successful but rather stuffy businessman (Michael Jayston), who meets and marries Belinda, a free-spirited American woman (Farrow). After a time, he believes she is having an affair because she spends long hours away from home during the day. Charles hires a private detective (Topol) to follow his wife. Belinda becomes aware that she is being followed, and the detective realises she has found out. However rather than abandoning the case, the detective begins an elaborate game of cat and mouse with the complicity of the wife. The detective finally informs Charles that his wife never had an affair, and merely goes on solitary exploratory walks around the city. The husband realises he has been neglectful and made his wife unhappy. He joins the game of following his wife as an adventure.

Cast
 Mia Farrow as Belinda  
 Topol as Julian Cristoforou  
 Michael Jayston as Charles  
 Margaret Rawlings as Mrs. Sidley  
 Annette Crosbie as Miss Framer  
 Dudley Foster as Mr. Mayhew  
 Michael Aldridge as Sir Philip Crouch  
 Michael Barrington as Mr. Scrampton  
 Neil McCarthy as Parkinson

Awards
Mia Farrow won the best actress award and Topol won the best actor award at the San Sebastian International Film Festival.

External links
 
 
 
 

1972 films
1972 comedy-drama films
British comedy-drama films
Films scored by John Barry (composer)
Films based on plays by Peter Shaffer
Films directed by Carol Reed
Films produced by Hal B. Wallis
Films set in London
Universal Pictures films
1970s English-language films
1970s British films